Ronaldo Kemble (born 24 July 1997) is a Surinamese footballer who plays as a defender for S.V. Transvaal and the Suriname national football team.

Early life

Kembele grew up in Nieuw Nickerie in Suriname.

Career

International
Kemble made his senior international debut on 16 March 2019, playing the entirety of a 3-1 friendly victory over Guyana.

Career statistics

International

References

External links

1997 births
Living people
S.V. Transvaal players
Surinamese footballers
Suriname international footballers
Association football defenders